Wang Meng may refer to:

Wang Meng (Former Qin) (325–375), minister of Former Qin in ancient China
Wang Meng (painter) (1308–1385), Chinese artist in Yuan Dynasty
Wang Meng (author) (born 1934), Chinese writer and former Minister of Culture

Sportspeople
Wang Meng (speed skater) (born 1985), Chinese speed skater
Wang Meng (curler) (born 1988), Chinese wheelchair curler
Wang Meng (figure skater) (born 1991), Chinese ice dancer
Wang Meng (footballer) (born 1993), Chinese association footballer
Wang Meng (cricketer) (born 1988), Chinese cricketer